Summer is a 1976 Estonian comedy film directed by Arvo Kruusement and based on the novels Suvi and Tootsi Pulm by Oskar Luts. The film is the sequel of the 1969 film Spring.

Plot

Cast
 Aare Laanemets - Joosep Toots
 Margus Lepa - Kiir
 Riina Hein - Raja Teele
 Margus Lepa - Jorh/Georg Adniel Kiir
 Kaljo Kiisk - Kristjan Lible
 Ain Lutsepp - Tõnisson
 Rein Aedma - Imelik
 Kalle Eomois - Kuslap
 Arno Liiver - Arno Tali
 Kaarel Karm - Apothecary
 Ervin Abel - Papa Kiir
 Malli Vällik - Katarina Rosalie
 Andres Kalev - Ottomar
 Marco Meelimäe - Bruno Benno Bernhard
 Endel Ani - Parish clerk
 Katrin Välbe - Parish clerk's wife
 Mare Garšnek - Miss Ärnja 
 Herta Elviste - Toots's mother
 Jüri Järvet - Toots's father
 Aino Vähi - Teele's mother
 Kalju Ruuven - Teele's father
 Tiina Rääk - Aliide

References

External links
 
 Summer, entry in Estonian Film Database (EFIS)

1976 films
Estonian comedy films
Estonian-language films
Films based on Estonian novels